The 2016 Copa Verde Finals was the final two-legged tie that decided the 2016 Copa Verde, the 3rd season of the Copa Verde, Brazil's regional cup football tournament organised by the Brazilian Football Confederation.

The finals were contested in a two-legged home-and-away format between Paysandu, from Pará, and Gama, from Distrito Federal.

Paysandu defeated Gama 3–2 on aggregate to win their first Copa Verde title.

Teams

Road to the final
Note: In all scores below, the score of the home team is given first.

Format
The finals were played on a home-and-away two-legged basis. If tied on aggregate, the penalty shoot-out was used to determine the winner.

Matches

First leg

Second leg

See also
2017 Copa do Brasil

References

Copa Verde Finals